Sergei Leonidovich Chumachenko (born 14 February 1973) is a former Russian professional footballer.

Club career
He made his professional debut in the Soviet Second League B in 1991 for FC Torpedo Mytishchi. He played 1 game in the UEFA Cup Winners' Cup 1993–94 for FC Torpedo Moscow.

Honours
 Russian Cup winner: 1993.

References

1973 births
Living people
Soviet footballers
Russian footballers
Association football midfielders
Russian Premier League players
FC Torpedo Moscow players
FC Torpedo-2 players
FC Znamya Truda Orekhovo-Zuyevo players